Jennifer Stone is a former American slalom canoeist who competed from the mid-1980s to the early 1990s. She won a silver medal in the K-1 team event at the 1989 ICF Canoe Slalom World Championships in Savage River.

References

American female canoeists
Living people
Place of birth missing (living people)
Year of birth missing (living people)
Medalists at the ICF Canoe Slalom World Championships
21st-century American women